Piz de Setag is a mountain of the Lepontine Alps, located on the Swiss-Italian border. It is situated between the Val da Montogn (Graubünden) and Val Pilotera (Lombardy).

References

External links
 Piz de Setag on Hikr

Mountains of the Alps
Mountains of Switzerland
Mountains of Italy
Mountains of Graubünden
Lepontine Alps
Italy–Switzerland border
International mountains of Europe
Two-thousanders of Switzerland